Usnea Plug is a volcanic plug, 30 m from base to summit, rising to 117 m in the interior of Byers Peninsula, Livingston Island in the South Shetland Islands, Antarctica.  The area was known to 19th century sealers.

The feature's name derives from the genus of lichen, Usnea, prevalent on the plug and in this vicinity, and results from geological work by an American field party in early 1969.

Location

Maps
 Península Byers, Isla Livingston. Mapa topográfico a escala 1:25000. Madrid: Servicio Geográfico del Ejército, 1992.
 L.L. Ivanov et al. Antarctica: Livingston Island and Greenwich Island, South Shetland Islands. Scale 1:100000 topographic map. Sofia: Antarctic Place-names Commission of Bulgaria, 2005.
 L.L. Ivanov. Antarctica: Livingston Island and Greenwich, Robert, Snow and Smith Islands. Scale 1:120000 topographic map.  Troyan: Manfred Wörner Foundation, 2009.

References
 SCAR Composite Antarctic Gazetteer.

Mountains of Livingston Island